Lara Fabian's third studio album Pure, was a three million-selling album, which reached Diamond status in France, from which came the anti-homophobia anthem "La différence." The album went platinum in less than two weeks. Lara again was bestowed with awards, being awarded a Félix Award for Popular Album Of The Year at the 1997 ADISQ gala and was also nominated for two Juno Awards of 1997 in the Best Female Singer and Best Selling French Album categories.
Pure has become one of the best-selling French-language albums of all time.

Track listing

Charts

Certifications

References

1997 albums
Lara Fabian albums
Polydor Records albums